The Bowling competition at the 2014 Central American and Caribbean Games was held in Veracruz, Mexico.

The tournament was scheduled to be held from 25–29 November at the Bolerama.

Medal summary

Men's events

Women's events

Medal table

References

External links
Official Website

2014 Central American and Caribbean Games events
2014
2014 in bowling
Central American and Caribbean Games
Qualification tournaments for the 2015 Pan American Games